Francis Stoughton Sullivan (1715–1766) was an Irish lawyer, and Professor of Oratory and law professor at the University of Dublin. 

Sullivan, a member of the Kerry O'Sullivan More family, was born in Galway and educated at Trinity College, Dublin, graduating with a Doctor of Laws (LL.D.) in 1745. He was called to the Bar the following year. In 1750 he was appointed Professor of Laws in Trinity, in 1759 Professor of Oratory, and three years later the first Regius Professor of Feudal and English Law. He was especially noted for excellence in the latter fields, and lectures he gave at the University, including commentaries on Magna Carta, were posthumously published in a volume called An Historical Treatise on the Feudal Law, and the Constitution and Laws of England (1772).

Sullivan also had a great interest in Irish history and Irish manuscripts all his life, and employed native scribes in preparing editions of Lebor Gabála Érenn (The Book of the Taking of Ireland) and the Annals of the Four Masters which never saw print. He died in Dublin on 1 March 1766. His son, William Francis Sullivan (1756–1830) served in the United States Navy, and published plays and poems.

Bibliography

.
.
.
.

References

Further reading

.

 

1715 births
1766 deaths
Academics of Trinity College Dublin
Alumni of Trinity College Dublin
18th-century Irish lawyers
Irish legal scholars
Irish legal writers
People from County Galway